NGC 4436 is a lenticular or dwarf elliptical galaxy located about 60 million light-years away in the constellation of Virgo. NGC 4436 was discovered by astronomer William Herschel on April 17, 1784. The galaxy is a member of the Virgo Cluster.

Interaction with NGC 4431
NGC 4436 is undergoing a tidal interaction with a nearby dwarf elliptical galaxy known as NGC 4431. The two galaxies are separated by around 58,680 light-years (18 kpc).

See also 
 List of NGC objects (4001–5000)
 NGC 4468

References

External links

Lenticular galaxies
Dwarf elliptical galaxies
Virgo (constellation)
4436
40903
7573
Astronomical objects discovered in 1784
Virgo Cluster